Morançais is a French surname that it may refer to:

Béatrice Pavy-Morançais, French politician
Christelle Morançais, French politician

French-language surnames